Nord-Est (French for northeast) may refer to:

 Nord-Est (department), Haiti
 Nord-Est (development region), a region in Romania

See also

 Northeast (disambiguation)
 

de:North East
it:North East
pam:Pangulu-aslagan
fi:Koillinen
vo:North East
war:Dumagsaan
zh:东北